The Calgary Crush were a semi-professional basketball team who were members of the American Basketball Association (ABA) from 2012 to 2015. The Crush played their home games at SAIT Polytechnic.

History 
The Crush were the second ABA team based in Calgary following the Calgary Drillers, which only played in the 2004-05 season before folding. Calgary Crush went undefeated in their inaugural ABA season playing in the nine-team Pacific Northwest Division.

The team announced on November 29, 2015 that the club would sit out the 2015–16 ABA season, citing a lack of funding.

Season-by-season

Roster

References

External links
 Calgary Crush official website
 Calgary Crush blog

Defunct American Basketball Association (2000–present) teams
Basketball teams in Alberta
Sports teams in Calgary
Basketball teams established in 2011
Basketball teams disestablished in 2015
2011 establishments in Alberta
2015 disestablishments in Alberta